Charles Woodbury may refer to:

 Charles Herbert Woodbury (1864–1942), American marine painter
 Charles Johnson Woodbury (1844–1927), lecturer on poetry & literature
Charles L. Woodbury (1820–1898), American lawyer and politician